Tridentarius is a monospecific genus of sea snails, marine gastropod mollusks in the family Strombidae, the true conchs.

Species
Species within the genus Tridentarius include:
Tridentarius dentatus (Linnaeus, 1758)

References

External links

Strombidae